The Utsuls ([]), are a Chamic-speaking East Asian ethnic group which lives on the island of Hainan and are considered one of the People's Republic of China's unrecognized ethnic groups. They are found on the southernmost tip of Hainan near the city of Sanya.

History
The Utsuls are thought to be descendants of Cham refugees who fled their homeland of Champa in what is now modern Central Vietnam to escape the Vietnamese invasion. After the Vietnamese completed the conquest of Cham in 1471, sacking Vijaya, the last capital of the Cham kingdom, a Cham prince and about 1,000 followers moved to Hainan, where the Ming dynasty allowed them to stay. Several Chinese accounts record Cham arriving on Hainan even earlier, from 986, shortly after the Vietnamese captured the earlier Cham capital of Indrapura in 982, while other Cham refugees settled in Guangzhou.

While most of the Chams who fled Champa to Cambodia, a small business class fled northwards. How they came to acquire the name Utsul is unknown.

Their population was greatly reduced during World War II by the Japanese that more than 4,000 Chams were killed in Sanya as Chinese armies were hiding among them from the invading Japanese.

Discrimination 

In 2020, it was reported that Beijing had started a religious crackdown aimed at the Utsul community as part of their political efforts. Restrictions included limiting the size of mosques, requiring a Communist Party member on mosque management committees, forbidding the use of Arabic words on food stalls (such as "halal"), and forbidding the wearing of hijab.

Identity
Although they are culturally, ethnically and linguistically distinct from the Hui, the Chinese government nevertheless classifies them as Hui due to their Islamic faith. From reports by Hans Stübel, the German ethnographer who made contact with them in the 1930s, however, their language is completely unrelated to any other language spoken in mainland China.

Genetics
A genetic study by Li et al. (2013) suggested that the surviving Utsat were genetically much closer to the indigenous Hlai than to the Cham and other mainland southeast Asian populations. The study suggests that there was high assimilation of the indigenous Hlai in the formation of the Utsat.

Family names
Some common Utsul family names include Chen, Ha, Hai, Jiang, Li, Liu and Pu.

Famous people
 Abdullah Ahmad Badawi, 5th Prime Minister of Malaysia. His maternal grandfather is of Utsul descent.

See also
 Undistinguished ethnic groups in China

References

Ethnic groups in China
Hainan
Cham
Muslim communities of China